Lypotigris is a genus of moths of the family Crambidae.

Species
Lypotigris fusalis (Hampson, 1904)
Lypotigris reginalis (Stoll in Cramer & Stoll, 1781)

References

Spilomelinae
Crambidae genera
Taxa named by Jacob Hübner